Watcharapong Klahan (Thai  วัชรพงศ์ กล้าหาญ) is a Thai former professional footballer and football coach.

Klahan played for Thailand at the 1997 FIFA U-17 World Championship in Egypt.

References

1978 births
Living people
Watcharapong Klahan
Watcharapong Klahan
Watcharapong Klahan
Watcharapong Klahan
Watcharapong Klahan
Watcharapong Klahan
Watcharapong Klahan
Watcharapong Klahan
Watcharapong Klahan
Watcharapong Klahan
Association football goalkeepers
Watcharapong Klahan